Eric Ellis Overmyer (born September 25, 1951) is an American writer and producer. He has written and/or produced numerous TV shows, including St. Elsewhere, Homicide: Life on the Street, Law & Order, The Wire, New Amsterdam, Bosch, Treme, and The Man in the High Castle.

Biography
He graduated as a theater major from Reed College in 1973. He credits his time at the college for helping him find and claim his identity as a writer.

Overmyer wrote for the NBC crime drama Homicide: Life on the Street from 1996 to 1999. He joined the crew as a writer for the fourth season. He became a consulting producer for the sixth season in fall 1997. He returned as a supervising producer for the seventh and final season in fall 1998. The series was based on the book Homicide: A Year on the Killing Streets by David Simon. Simon also worked as a writer and producer on the later seasons on the show and the two became friends.

Overmyer joined the crew of Law & Order as a consulting producer and writer for the twelfth season in 2001. He became a co-executive producer for the later part of the season. He remained in this role until he was promoted to executive producer for the fifteenth season in fall 2004. He left the show after the conclusion of the fifteenth season.

Overmyer joined the crew of The Wire as a consulting producer and writer for the fourth season in 2006. Overmyer wrote the teleplays for the episodes "Margin of Error" and "Misgivings". from stories he co-wrote with producer Ed Burns. Overmyer was hired to replace George Pelecanos as a full-time writer and producer. Simon has said that he was impressed with Overmyer's writing, particularly in synthesising the story for "Margin of Error" as the episode is the height of the show's political storyline but must also progress other plot threads. As a member of the fourth season writing staff, Overmyer has been credited as overseeing the domestic storyline of Jimmy McNulty and "smartly fleshing out" some of his key scenes. Overmyer left the crew at the end of the fourth season. Overmyer and the writing staff won the Writers Guild of America Award for Best Dramatic Series at the February 2008 ceremony and the 2007 Edgar Award for Best Television Feature/Mini-Series Teleplay for their work on the fourth season.

Overmyer collaborated with Simon again on the HBO drama Treme. They co-created the series which is about post-Katrina New Orleans. Overmyer lives part-time in New Orleans and used his experience in navigating the "ornate oral tradition" of the city's stories. The show focuses on a working-class neighborhood and is smaller in scope than The Wire. Production for the first season began in November 2009 and Overmyer worked on the show until it concluded with a fourth season in 2013.

In the hiatus between the third and fourth seasons of Treme Overmyer joined the crew of the HBO drama series Boardwalk Empire. He served as a co-executive producer for the fourth season until production recommenced on Treme. On Boardwalk Empire Overmyer reunited with his colleague from The Wire Dennis Lehane. He also worked with the writers Steve Turner and Jennifer Ames.

Overmyer developed the Amazon original series Bosch based on the series of novels by Michael Connelly. The project reunited him with actors Jamie Hector and Lance Reddick. A pilot was produced in 2013. The show was ordered to series after being released through the Amazon streaming service in February 2014. For his writing staff Overmyer assembled several writers he had worked with before - Pelecanos from The Wire and Treme, Turner and Ames from Boardwalk Empire and William N. Fordes & Tom Smuts from Law & Order. The first season was shot throughout 2014 and released on February 13, 2015.

Published plays

His plays have been published by Broadway Play Publishing Inc. and include:

Alki (adaption of Peer Gynt by Henrik Ibsen)
Amphitryon (adaption of the plays by Giraudoux and von Kleist respectively)
Dark Rapture
Don Quixote de La Jolla
Figaro/Figaro
The Heliotrope Bouquet by Scott Joplin and Louis Chauvin
In a Pig's Valise
In Perpetuity Throughout the Universe
Mi Vida Loca
Native Speech
On the Verge

Awards

References

External links

Living people
Reed College alumni
American television producers
American television writers
American male television writers
Writers from Boulder, Colorado
Writers from New Orleans
Writers Guild of America Award winners
20th-century American dramatists and playwrights
1951 births
American male dramatists and playwrights
20th-century American male writers
Screenwriters from Colorado
Screenwriters from Louisiana
Highline High School alumni